Robert Jason Costanzo (born October 20, 1942) is an American film, television and voice actor. A character actor with an acting career spanning over 40 years, who is often found playing surly New York City types such as crooks, low-level workers and policemen, and mixes both drama and comedy roles. 

He is also a voice actor, best known as the voice of Harvey Bullock in the DC Animated Universe, and often serves as a voice double for Danny DeVito, most notably as Philoctetes in the Kingdom Hearts video game series.

Early life
Born in Brooklyn, New York, he is the son of actor Carmine Costanzo and is of Italian descent. He attended both the St. Francis Preparatory School and the St. Francis College.

Career
His first role was in the 1975 movie Dog Day Afternoon playing a cop, although this was an uncredited part. This was followed by a role as a paint store customer in the 1977 film Saturday Night Fever. Other movie roles include Total Recall, Die Hard 2, Dick Tracy, City Slickers, and Down and Derby. His television appearances are varied, with him appearing in Lois & Clark, Boston Legal, Hannah Montana, Friends and Joey as the father of main character Joey Tribbiani, Days of Our Lives, The Golden Girls and numerous other series. He also starred as Commissioner Stenchler in the Sega CD game Sewer Shark.

He is also a cartoon voice actor and has done voices on shows including Disney's Hercules: The Animated Series, The Fairly OddParents, The Zeta Project, Disney's House of Mouse, Duckman, Bonkers, and Random! Cartoons, among others. He also did the voice of Detective Harvey Bullock in the DC animated universe, consisting of Batman: The Animated Series, Superman: The Animated Series, The New Batman Adventures and Static Shock, as well as in the theatrical release Mask of the Phantasm, and the video releases Batman & Mr. Freeze: SubZero, and Mystery of the Batwoman. He also played a vocal role in the 2006 video game The Sopranos: Road to Respect as Angelo and in the 2010 video game Mafia II as Joe Barbaro and Federico "Derek" Pappalardo.

He played softball in Los Angeles with actors Bruno Kirby and Leo Rossi in the late 1970s.

He returned to reprise his voice role of Harvey Bullock for the release of the video game Batman: Arkham Origins in 2013.

Filmography

Film

Television

Video games

References

External links
 
 

1942 births
Living people
American male film actors
American male television actors
American male video game actors
American male voice actors
American people of Italian descent
Male actors from New York City
People from Brooklyn